Colegio Helvetica de Bogotá (CHB) is a Swiss international school in Bogotá, Colombia. It serves up to grade 12 (final year of Sekundarstufe II).

It was founded in 1949.  it has 780 students.

References

External links

 Colegio Helvetica de Bogotá 
 "Schweizerschule Bogotá" (Archive) - EAD, Swiss National Library 

International schools in Bogotá
Swiss international schools
Educational institutions established in 1949
1949 establishments in Colombia